T cell receptor alpha variable 12-2 is a protein that in humans is encoded by the TRAV12-2 gene.

References